Adelaide was a wooden schooner that was lost after leaving Newcastle, New South Wales carrying a load of coal on a voyage to Gisborne, New Zealand in May 1898. There were two deaths.

Further reading
Online Databases
Australian National Shipwreck Database
Australian Shipping - Arrivals and Departures 1788-1968 including shipwrecks 
Encyclopedia of Australian Shipwrecks - New South Wales Shipwrecks 

Books
Wrecks on the New South Wales Coast. By Loney, J. K. (Jack Kenneth), 1925–1995 Oceans Enterprises. 1993 .
Australian shipwrecks Vol. 3 1871–1900 By Loney, J. K. (Jack Kenneth), 1925–1995. Geelong Vic: List Publishing, 1982 910.4530994 LON

References

External links

Shipwrecks of the Hunter Region
Ships built in New South Wales
1879 ships
Maritime incidents in 1898
1871–1900 ships of Australia
Merchant ships of Australia
Schooners of Australia